This is a list of the bird species recorded in Spain. The area covered by this list is mainland Spain, the Balearic Islands, the Canary Islands, and three small Spanish enclaves on the North African shore. The avifauna of Spain included a total of 662 species recorded in the wild by 2022 according to Sociedad Española de Ornitología (SEO/BirdLife) with supplemental additions from Avibase. 24 have been introduced by humans, six of which also have possibly wild-origin records. Three species have not been recorded since 1950, 8 are endemic to Spanish islands, and one of the endemic species is extinct.

This list's taxonomic treatment (designation and sequence of orders, families and species) and nomenclature (English and scientific names) are those of The Clements Checklist of Birds of the World, 2022 edition. The Spanish names in parentheses are from the SEO/BirdLife list.

The following tags have been used to highlight some categories of occurrence. 
(A) Accidental – a species that rarely or accidentally occurs anywhere in Spain
(A) Accidental in limited area – a species found regularly in mainland Spain but accidentally in the Canary Islands or the North African enclaves.
(E) Endemic – a species found only in Spain, with the location appended
(Ex) Extirpated - a species that no longer occurs in Spain although populations exist elsewhere
(I) Introduced – a species introduced to Spain as a consequence, direct or indirect, of human actions and that has an established population 
(B) Category B - species which have not been recorded in Spain since 1950
(D) Category D – species for which there are reasonable doubts as to their wild origin
(I/D) species with individuals of possible wild origin in addition to the introduced population

An additional note such as (Canary Islands only) means that the species has been recorded solely in that locality. Species without a note of that type have been recorded at a minimum in mainland Spain. The notes of population status such as "endangered" apply to the world population and are from Bird Checklists of the World.

Ducks, geese, and waterfowl
Order: AnseriformesFamily: Anatidae

Anatidae includes the ducks and most duck-like waterfowl, such as geese and swans. These birds are adapted to an aquatic existence with webbed feet, flattened bills, and feathers that are excellent at shedding water due to an oily coating.

White-faced whistling-duck, Dendrocygna viduata (A) (D)
Fulvous whistling-duck, Dendrocygna bicolor (A) (D)
Bar-headed goose, Anser indicus (I)
Snow goose, Anser caerulescens (A)
Graylag goose, Anser anser (A)
Greater white-fronted goose, Anser albifrons (A) – Canary Islands)
Lesser white-fronted goose, Anser erythropus  (A) vulnerable
Taiga bean-goose, Anser fabalis (A)
Tundra bean-goose, Anser serrirostris (A)
Pink-footed goose, Anser brachyrhynchus (A – Canary Islands)
Brant, Branta bernicla (A – Canary Islands)
Barnacle goose, Branta leucopsis (A)
Cackling goose, Branta hutchinsii (A) (D)
Canada goose, Branta canadensis (I)
Red-breasted goose, Branta ruficollis (A) vulnerable
Mute swan, Cygnus olor
Black swan, Cygnus atratus (I)
Tundra swan, Cygnus columbianus (A)
Whooper swan, Cygnus cygnus (A)
Egyptian goose, Alopochen aegyptiaca (I)
Ruddy shelduck, Tadorna ferruginea (A – Canary Islands)
Common shelduck, Tadorna tadorna
Muscovy duck, Cairina moschata (I) (Canary Islands only)
Wood duck, Aix sponsa (A) (D) 
Mandarin duck, Aix galericulata (I) (Canary Islands only)
Baikal teal, Sibirionetta formosa (A) vulnerable
Garganey, Spatula querquedula
Blue-winged teal, Spatula discors (A)
Cinnamon teal, Spatula cyanoptera (A) (D)
Northern shoveler, Spatula clypeata
Gadwall, Mareca strepera
Falcated duck, Mareca falcata (A) near-threatened
Eurasian wigeon, Mareca penelope
American wigeon, Mareca americana (A)
Mallard, Anas platyrhynchos
American black duck, Anas rubripes (A)
Northern pintail, Anas acuta
Green-winged teal, Anas crecca 
Marbled teal, Marmaronetta angustirostris vulnerable
Red-crested pochard, Netta rufina
Common pochard, Aythya ferina vulnerable
Ring-necked duck, Aythya collaris (A)
Ferruginous duck, Aythya nyroca  (A – Canary Islands) near-threatened
Tufted duck, Aythya fuligula
Greater scaup, Aythya marila (A – Canary Islands)
Lesser scaup, Aythya affinis (A)
King eider, Somateria spectabilis (A) 
Common eider, Somateria mollissima near-threatened
Surf scoter, Melanitta perspicillata (A)
Velvet scoter, Melanitta fusca
White-winged scoter, Melanitta deglandi (A)
Stejneger's scoter, Melanitta stejnegeri (A)
Common scoter, Melanitta nigra (A – Canary Islands)
Black scoter, Melanitta americana (A) near-threatened
Long-tailed duck, Clangula hyemalis (A – Canary Islands) vulnerable
Bufflehead, Bucephala albeola (A)
Common goldeneye, Bucephala clangula (A)
Barrow's goldeneye, Bucephala islandica (A)
Smew, Mergellus albellus (A)
Hooded merganser, Lophodytes cucullatus (A)
Common merganser, Mergus merganser (A)
Red-breasted merganser, Mergus serrator (A – Canary Islands)
Ruddy duck, Oxyura jamaicensis (I)
White-headed duck, Oxyura leucocephala endangered

Pheasants, grouse, and allies
Order: GalliformesFamily: Phasianidae

The Phasianidae are a family of terrestrial birds. In general, they are plump (although they vary in size) and have broad, relatively short wings.

Hazel grouse, Tetrastes bonasia (Ex)
Willow ptarmigan, Lagopus lagopus (A)
Rock ptarmigan, Lagopus muta
Western capercaillie, Tetraus urogallus
Gray partridge, Perdix perdix
Ring-necked pheasant, Phasianus colchicus (I)
Black francolin, Francolinus francolinus (Ex)
Common quail, Coturnix coturnix
Barbary partridge, Alectoris barbara (I)
Red-legged partridge, Alectoris rufa

Flamingos
Order: PhoenicopteriformesFamily: Phoenicopteridae

Flamingos filter-feed on shellfish and algae. Their oddly shaped beaks are specially adapted to separate mud and silt from the food they consume and, uniquely, are used upside-down.

Greater flamingo, Phoenicopterus roseus
Lesser flamingo, Phoeniconaias minor (A) near-threatened

Grebes
Order: PodicipediformesFamily: Podicipedidae

Grebes are small to medium-large freshwater diving birds. They have lobed toes and are excellent swimmers and divers. However, they have their feet placed far back on the body, making them quite ungainly on land.

Little grebe, Tachybaptus ruficollis (A – Canary Islands)
Pied-billed grebe, Podilymbus podiceps (A)
Horned grebe, Podiceps auritus vulnerable
Red-necked grebe, Podiceps grisegena (A)
Great crested grebe, Podiceps cristatus
Eared grebe, Podiceps nigricollis

Pigeons and doves
Order: ColumbiformesFamily: Columbidae

Pigeons and doves are stout-bodied birds with short necks and short slender bills with a fleshy cere.

Rock pigeon, Columba livia (I)
Stock dove, Columba oenas
Common wood-pigeon, Columba palumbus
Bolle's pigeon, Columba bollii (E – Canary Islands)
Laurel pigeon, Columba junoniae (E – Canary Islands) near-threatened
European turtle-dove, Streptopelia turtur vulnerable
Oriental turtle-dove, Streptopelia orientalis (A)
Eurasian collared-dove, Streptopelia decaocto
African collared-dove, Streptopelia roseogrisea (I)
Laughing dove, Streptopelia senegalensis (A)
Namaqua dove, Oena capensis (A) (D)
Mourning dove, Zenaida macroura (A) (D)

Sandgrouse
Order: PterocliformesFamily: Pteroclidae

Sandgrouse have small, pigeon like heads and necks, but sturdy compact bodies. They have long pointed wings and sometimes tails and a fast direct flight. Flocks fly to watering holes at dawn and dusk. Their legs are feathered down to the toes.

Pallas's sandgrouse, Syrrhaptes paradoxus (A)
Pin-tailed sandgrouse, Pterocles alchata
Spotted sandgrouse, Pterocles senegallus (A)
Black-bellied sandgrouse, Pterocles orientalis

Bustards
Order: OtidiformesFamily: Otididae

Bustards are large terrestrial birds mainly associated with dry open country and steppes in the Old World. They are omnivorous and nest on the ground. They walk steadily on strong legs and big toes, pecking for food as they go. They have long broad wings with "fingered" wingtips and striking patterns in flight. Many have interesting mating displays.

Great bustard, Otis tarda vulnerable
Houbara bustard, Chlamydotis undulata (Canary Islands only) vulnerable
Little bustard, Tetrax tetrax near-threatened

Cuckoos
Order: CuculiformesFamily: Cuculidae

The family Cuculidae includes cuckoos, roadrunners and anis. These birds are of variable size with slender bodies, long tails and strong legs. The Old World cuckoos are brood parasites.

Great spotted cuckoo, Clamator glandarius
Yellow-billed cuckoo, Coccyzus americanus (A)
Common cuckoo, Cuculus canorus

Nightjars and allies
Order: CaprimulgiformesFamily: Caprimulgidae

Nightjars are medium-sized nocturnal birds that usually nest on the ground. They have long wings, short legs and very short bills. Most have small feet, of little use for walking, and long pointed wings. Their soft plumage is camouflaged to resemble bark or leaves.

Common nighthawk, Chordeiles minor (A)
Red-necked nightjar, Caprimulgus ruficollis
Eurasian nightjar, Caprimulgus europaeus
Egyptian nightjar, Caprimulgus aegyptius (A) (Canary Islands only)

Swifts
Order: CaprimulgiformesFamily: Apodidae

Swifts are small birds which spend the majority of their lives flying. These birds have very short legs and never settle voluntarily on the ground, perching instead only on vertical surfaces. Many swifts have long swept-back wings which resemble a crescent or boomerang.

Chimney swift, Chaetura pelagica (A) vulnerable
White-throated needletail, Hirundapus caudacutus (A)
Alpine swift, Apus melba
Common swift, Apus apus
Plain swift, Apus unicolor
Pallid swift, Apus pallidus
Pacific swift, Apus pacificus (A)
Little swift, Apus affinis (A – Canary Islands)
White-rumped swift, Apus caffer (A – Canary Islands)

Rails, gallinules, and coots
Order: GruiformesFamily: Rallidae

Rallidae is a large family of small to medium-sized birds which includes the rails, crakes, coots and gallinules. Typically they inhabit dense vegetation in damp environments near lakes, swamps or rivers. In general they are shy and secretive birds, making them difficult to observe. Most species have strong legs and long toes which are well adapted to soft uneven surfaces. They tend to have short, rounded wings and to be weak fliers.

Water rail, Rallus aquaticus
Corn crake, Crex crex  (A)
African crake, Crex egregia (A)
Sora, Porzana carolina (A)
Spotted crake, Porzana porzana
Lesser moorhen, Gallinula angulata (A)
Eurasian moorhen, Gallinula chloropus
Eurasian coot, Fulica atra
Red-knobbed coot, Fulica cristata
American coot, Fulica americana (A)
Allen's gallinule, Porphyrio alleni (A)
Purple gallinule, Porphyrio martinicus (A)
Western swamphen, Porphyrio porphyrio
African swamphen, Porphyrio madagascariensis (A)
Striped crake, Amaurornis marginalis (A)
Little crake, Zapornia parva (A – Canary Islands)
Baillon's crake, Zapornia pusilla (A – Canary Islands and African enclaves)

Cranes
Order: GruiformesFamily: Gruidae

Cranes are large, long-legged and long-necked birds. Unlike the similar-looking but unrelated herons, cranes fly with necks outstretched, not pulled back. Most have elaborate and noisy courting displays or "dances".

Demoiselle crane, Virgo anthropoids (A)
Sandhill crane, Antigone canadensis (A)
Common crane, Grus grus (A – Canary Islands)

Sheathbills
Order: CharadriiformesFamily: Chionididae

The sheathbills are scavengers of the Antarctic regions. They have white plumage and look plump and dove-like but are believed to be similar to the ancestors of the modern gulls and terns.

Snowy sheathbill, Chionis albus (A)

Thick-knees
Order: CharadriiformesFamily: Burhinidae

The thick-knees are a group of largely tropical waders in the family Burhinidae. They are found worldwide within the tropical zone, with some species also breeding in temperate Europe and Australia. They are medium to large waders with strong black or yellow-black bills, large yellow eyes and cryptic plumage. Despite being classed as waders, most species have a preference for arid or semi-arid habitats.

Eurasian thick-knee, Burhinus oedicnemus

Egyptian plover
Order: CharadriiformesFamily: Pluvianidae

The Egyptian plover is found across equatorial Africa and along the Nile River.

Egyptian plover, Pluvianus aegyptius (A)

Stilts and avocets
Order: CharadriiformesFamily: Recurvirostridae

Recurvirostridae is a family of large wading birds, which includes the avocets and stilts. The avocets have long legs and long up-curved bills. The stilts have extremely long legs and long, thin, straight bills.

Black-winged stilt, Himantopus himantopus
Pied avocet, Recurvirostra avosetta

Oystercatchers
Order: CharadriiformesFamily: Haematopodidae

The oystercatchers are large and noisy plover-like birds, with strong bills used for smashing or prising open molluscs.

Eurasian oystercatcher, Haematopus ostralegus
American oystercatcher, Haematopus palliatus (A)
Canarian oystercatcher, Haematopus meadewaldoi (E – Canary Islands) (extinct)

Plovers and lapwings
Order: CharadriiformesFamily: Charadriidae

The family Charadriidae includes the plovers, dotterels and lapwings. They are small to medium-sized birds with compact bodies, short, thick necks and long, usually pointed, wings. They are found in open country worldwide, mostly in habitats near water.

Black-bellied plover, Pluvialis squatarola
European golden-plover, Pluvialis apricaria
American golden-plover, Pluvialis dominica (A)
Pacific golden-plover, Pluvialis fulva (A)
Northern lapwing, Vanellus vanellus near-threatened
Sociable lapwing, Vanellus gregarius (A) critically endangered
White-tailed lapwing, Vanellus leucurus (A)
Lesser sand-plover, Charadrius mongolus (A)
Greater sand-plover, Charadrius leschenaultii (A)
Kittlitz's plover, Charadrius pecuarius (A)
Kentish plover, Charadrius alexandrinus
Common ringed plover, Charadrius hiaticula
Semipalmated plover, Charadrius semipalmatus (A)
Little ringed plover, Charadrius dubius
Killdeer, Charadrius vociferus (A)
Eurasian dotterel, Charadrius morinellus

Sandpipers and allies
Order: CharadriiformesFamily: Scolopacidae

Scolopacidae is a large diverse family of small to medium-sized shorebirds including the sandpipers, curlews, godwits, shanks, tattlers, woodcocks, snipes, dowitchers and phalaropes. The majority of these species eat small invertebrates picked out of the mud or soil. Variation in length of legs and bills enables multiple species to feed in the same habitat, particularly on the coast, without direct competition for food.

Upland sandpiper, Bartramia longicauda (A)
Whimbrel, Numenius phaeopus
Slender-billed curlew, Numenius tenuirostris (A) critically endangered
Eurasian curlew, Numenius arquata near-threatened
Bar-tailed godwit, Limosa lapponica near-threatened
Black-tailed godwit, Limosa limosa near-threatened
Hudsonian godwit, Limosa haemastica (A)
Ruddy turnstone, Arenaria interpres
Great knot, Calidris tenuirostris (A) endangered
Red knot, Calidris canutus near-threatened
Ruff, Calidris pugnax
Broad-billed sandpiper, Calidris falcinellus (A)
Sharp-tailed sandpiper, Calidris acuminata (A)
Stilt sandpiper, Calidris himantopus (A)
Curlew sandpiper, Calidris ferruginea near-threatened
Temminck's stint, Calidris temminckii (A – Canary Islands)
Red-necked stint, Calidris ruficollis (A) near-threatened
Sanderling, Calidris alba
Dunlin, Calidris alpina
Purple sandpiper, Calidris maritima (A – Canary Islands)
Baird's sandpiper, Calidris bairdii (A)
Little stint, Calidris minuta
Least sandpiper, Calidris minutilla (A)
White-rumped sandpiper, Calidris fuscicollis (A)
Buff-breasted sandpiper, Calidris subruficollis (A – Canary Islands) near-threatened
Pectoral sandpiper, Calidris melanotos
Semipalmated sandpiper, Calidris pusilla (A) near-threatened
Western sandpiper, Calidris mauri (A)
Short-billed dowitcher, Limnodromus griseus (A)
Long-billed dowitcher, Limnodromus scolopaceus (A)
Jack snipe, Lymnocryptes minimus
Eurasian woodcock, Scolopax rusticola
Great snipe, Gallinago media (A) near-threatened
Common snipe, Gallinago gallinago
Wilson's snipe, Gallinago delicata (A)  (Canary Islands only)
Terek sandpiper, Xenus cinereus (A)
Wilson's phalarope, Phalaropus tricolor (A)
Red-necked phalarope, Phalaropus lobatus (A – Canary Islands)
Red phalarope, Phalaropus fulicarius
Common sandpiper, Actitis hypoleucos
Spotted sandpiper, Actitis macularius (A)
Green sandpiper, Tringa ochropus
Solitary sandpiper, Tringa solitaria (A)
Spotted redshank, Tringa erythropus
Greater yellowlegs, Tringa melanoleuca (A)
Common greenshank, Tringa nebularia
Lesser yellowlegs, Tringa flavipes (A)
Marsh sandpiper, Tringa stagnatilis (A – Canary Islands)
Wood sandpiper, Tringa glareola
Common redshank, Tringa totanus

Buttonquail
Order: CharadriiformesFamily: Turnicidae

The buttonquail are small, drab, running birds which resemble the true quails. The female is the brighter of the sexes and initiates courtship. The male incubates the eggs and tends the young.

Small buttonquail, Turnix sylvaticus (A)

Pratincoles and coursers
Order: CharadriiformesFamily: Glareolidae

Glareolidae is a family of wading birds comprising the pratincoles, which have short legs, long pointed wings and long forked tails, and the coursers, which have long legs, short wings and long, pointed bills which curve downwards.

Cream-colored courser, Cursorius cursor 
Collared pratincole, Glareola pratincola
Black-winged pratincole, Glareola nordmanni (A) near-threatened

Skuas and jaegers
Order: CharadriiformesFamily: Stercorariidae

The family Stercorariidae are, in general, medium to large birds, typically with grey or brown plumage, often with white markings on the wings. They nest on the ground in temperate and arctic regions and are long-distance migrants.

Great skua, Stercorarius skua
South polar skua, Stercorarius maccormicki (A)
Pomarine jaeger, Stercorarius pomarinus
Parasitic jaeger, Stercorarius parasiticus
Long-tailed jaeger, Stercorarius longicaudus (A)

Auks, murres, and puffins
Order: CharadriiformesFamily: Alcidae

Auks are superficially similar to penguins due to their black-and-white colors, their upright posture and some of their habits; however, they are not related to the penguins and differ in being able to fly. Auks live on the open sea, only deliberately coming ashore to nest.

Dovekie, Alle alle (A)
Common murre, Uria aalge 
Razorbill, Alca torda near-threatened
Black guillemot, Cepphus grylle (A)
Atlantic puffin, Fratercula arctica

Gulls, terns, and skimmers
Order: CharadriiformesFamily: Laridae

Laridae is a family of medium to large seabirds, the gulls, terns, and skimmers. Gulls are typically grey or white, often with black markings on the head or wings. They have stout, longish bills and webbed feet. Terns are a group of generally medium to large seabirds typically with grey or white plumage, often with black markings on the head. Most terns hunt fish by diving but some pick insects off the surface of fresh water. Terns are generally long-lived birds, with several species known to live in excess of 30 years.

Black-legged kittiwake, Rissa tridactyla vulnerable
Sabine's gull, Xema sabini (A)
Slender-billed gull, Chroicocephalus genei
Bonaparte's gull, Chroicocephalus philadelphia (A)
Gray-hooded gull, Chroicocephalus cirrocephalus (A)
Black-headed gull, Chroicocephalus ridibundus
Little gull, Hydrocoloeus minutus 
Ross's gull, Rhodostethia rosea (A)
Laughing gull, Leucophaeus atricilla (A)
Franklin's gull, Leucophaeus pipixcan (A)
Mediterranean gull, Ichthyaetus melanocephalus
Pallas's gull, Ichthyaetus ichthyaetus (A)
Audouin's gull, Ichthyaetus audouinii
Common gull, Larus canus 
Ring-billed gull, Larus delawarensis 
Herring gull, Larus argentatus
Yellow-legged gull, Larus michahellis
Caspian gull, Larus cachinnans (A)
Iceland gull, Larus glaucoides (A – Canary Islands and African enclaves)
Lesser black-backed gull, Larus fuscus
Glaucous-winged gull, Larus glaucescens (A) (Canary Islands only)
Glaucous gull, Larus hyperboreus (A – Canary Islands and African enclaves)
Great black-backed gull, Larus marinus
Kelp gull, Larus dominicanus (A)
Sooty tern, Onychoprion fuscatus (A)
Bridled tern, Onychoprion anaethetus (A)
Little tern, Sternula albifrons
Least tern, Sternula antillarum (A – Canary Islands)
Gull-billed tern, Gelochelidon nilotica
Caspian tern, Hydroprogne caspia (A – Canary Islands)
Black tern, Chlidonias niger
White-winged tern, Chlidonias leucopterus (A – Canary Islands)
Whiskered tern, Chlidonias hybrida
Roseate tern, Sterna dougallii
Common tern, Sterna hirundo
Arctic tern, Sterna paradisaea (A)
Forster's tern, Sterna forsteri (A)
White-cheeked tern, Sterna represses (A)
Sandwich tern, Thalasseus sandvicensis
Elegant tern, Thalasseus elegans (A) near-threatened
Lesser crested tern, Thalasseus bengalensis (A – Canary Islands)
West African crested tern, Thalasseus albididorsalis (A)

Tropicbirds
Order: PhaethontiformesFamily: Phaethontidae

Tropicbirds are slender white birds of tropical oceans with exceptionally long central tail feathers. Their long wings have black markings, as does the head.

Red-billed tropicbird, Phaeton aetherius (A)

Loons
Order: GaviiformesFamily: Gaviidae

Loons, known as divers in Europe, are a group of aquatic birds found in many parts of North America and northern Europe. They are the size of a large duck or small goose, which they somewhat resemble when swimming, but to which they are completely unrelated.

Red-throated loon, Gavia stellata
Arctic loon, Gavia arctica (A – Canary Islands)
Pacific loon, Gavia pacifica (A)
Common loon, Gavia immer (A – Canary Islands and African enclaves)

Albatrosses
Order: ProcellariiformesFamily: Diomedeidae

The albatrosses are among the largest flying birds, with long, narrow wings for gliding. The majority are found in the Southern Hemisphere with only vagrants occurring in the North Atlantic.

Yellow-nosed albatross, Thalassarche chlororhynchos (A)
Black-browed albatross, Thalassarche melanophris (A)

Southern storm-petrels
Order: ProcellariiformesFamily: Oceanitidae

Southern storm petrels, are  seabirds in the family Oceanitidae, part of the order Procellariiformes. These smallest of seabirds feed on planktonic crustaceans and small fish picked from the surface, typically while hovering. Their flight is fluttering and sometimes bat-like.

Wilson's storm-petrel, Oceanites oceanicus
White-faced storm-petrel, Pelagodroma marina (A)
Black-bellied storm-petrel, Fregetta tropica (A) (Canary Islands only)

Northern storm-petrels
Order: ProcellariiformesFamily: Hydrobatidae

Though the members of this family are similar in many respects to the southern storm-petrels, including their general appearance and habits, there are enough genetic differences to warrant their placement in a separate family. 

European storm-petrel, Hydrobates pelagicus
Leach's storm-petrel, Hydrobates leucorheus vulnerable
Swinhoe's storm-petrel, Hydrobates monorhis (A) near-threatened
Band-rumped storm-petrel, Hydrobates castro (A)

Shearwaters and petrels
Order: ProcellariiformesFamily: Procellariidae

The procellariids are the main group of medium-sized "true petrels", characterised by united nostrils with medium septum and a long outer functional primary.

Northern fulmar, Fulmarus glacialis (A – Canary Islands)
Cape petrel, Daption capense (A)
Great-winged petrel, Pterodroma macroptera (A)
Zino's petrel, Pterodroma madeira (A) endangered
Fea's petrel, Pterodroma feae (A)
Black-capped petrel, Pterodroma hasitata (A)
Bulwer's petrel, Bulweria bulwerii (A)
Cory's shearwater, Calonectris diomedea
Cape Verde shearwater, Calonectris edwardsii (A) (Canary Islands only) near-threatened
Great shearwater, Ardenna gravis 
Sooty shearwater, Ardenna griseus  (A – Canary Islands) near-threatened
Manx shearwater, Puffinus puffinus 
Yelkouan shearwater, Puffinus yelkouan vulnerable
Balearic shearwater, Puffinus mauretanicus (A – Canary Islands) critically endangered
Barolo shearwater, Puffinus baroli (A)
Boyd's shearwater, Puffinus boydi (A) (Canary Islands only)

Storks
Order: CiconiiformesFamily: Ciconiidae

Storks are large, long-legged, long-necked, wading birds with long, stout bills. Storks are mute, but bill-clattering is an important mode of communication at the nest. Their nests can be large and may be reused for many years. Many species are migratory.

Black stork, Ciconia nigra
White stork, Ciconia ciconia
Marabou stork, Leptoptilos crumenifer (A) (D)
Yellow-billed stork, Mycteria ibis (A) (D)

Frigatebirds
Order: SuliformesFamily: Fregatidae

Frigatebirds are large seabirds usually found over tropical oceans. They are large, black, or black-and-white, with long wings and deeply forked tails. The males have colored inflatable throat pouches. They do not swim or walk and cannot take off from a flat surface. Having the largest wingspan-to-body-weight ratio of any bird, they are essentially aerial, able to stay aloft for more than a week.

Magnificent frigatebird, Fregata magnificens (A)

Boobies and gannets
Order: SuliformesFamily: Sulidae

The sulids comprise the gannets and boobies. Both groups are medium to large coastal seabirds that plunge-dive for fish.

Masked booby, Sula dactylatra (A)
Brown booby, Sula leucogaster (A)
Red-footed booby, Sula sula (A)
Northern gannet, Morus bassanus
Cape gannet, Morus capensis (A)

Cormorants and shags
Order: SuliformesFamily: Phalacrocoracidae

Phalacrocoracidae is a family of medium to large coastal, fish-eating seabirds that includes cormorants and shags. Plumage colouration varies, with the majority having mainly dark plumage, some species being black-and-white and a few being colourful.

Long-tailed cormorant, Microcarbo africanus (A) (D)
Pygmy cormorant, Microcarbo pygmeus (A) near-threatened
Great cormorant, Phalacrocorax carbo
European shag, Gulosus aristotelis
Double-crested cormorant, Nannopterum auritum (A) (Canary Islands only)

Pelicans
Order: PelecaniformesFamily: Pelecanidae

Pelicans are large water birds with a distinctive pouch under their beak. As with other members of the order Pelecaniformes, they have webbed feet with four toes.

Great white pelican, Pelecanus onocrotalus
Pink-backed pelican, Pelecanus rufescens (A) (D)
Dalmatian pelican, Pelecanus crispus (A) (D) near-threatened

Heron, egrets, and bitterns
Order: PelecaniformesFamily: Ardeidae

The family Ardeidae contains the bitterns, herons and egrets. Herons and egrets are medium to large wading birds with long necks and legs. Bitterns tend to be shorter necked and more wary. Members of Ardeidae fly with their necks retracted, unlike other long-necked birds such as storks, ibises and spoonbills.

American bittern, Botaurus lentiginosus (A)
Great bittern, Botaurus stellaris (A – Canary Islands)
Little bittern, Ixobrychus minutus
Dwarf bittern, Ixobrychus sturmii (A) (Canary Islands only)
Great blue heron, Ardea herodias (A) (Canary Islands only)
Gray heron, Ardea cinerea
Purple heron, Ardea purpurea
Great egret, Ardea alba (A – Canary Islands)
Little egret, Egretta garzetta
Western reef-heron, Egretta gularis (A)
Tricolored heron, Egretta tricolor (A) (Canary Islands only)
Cattle egret, Bubulcus ibis
Squacco heron, Ardeola ralloides
Green heron, Butorides virescens (A) (Canary Islands only)
Striated heron, Butorides striata (A)
Black-crowned night-heron, Nycticorax nycticorax

Ibises and spoonbills
Order: PelecaniformesFamily: Threskiornithidae

Threskiornithidae is a family of large terrestrial and wading birds which includes the ibises and spoonbills. They have long, broad wings with 11 primary and about 20 secondary feathers. They are strong fliers and despite their size and weight, very capable soarers.

Glossy ibis, Plegadis falcinellus
African sacred ibis, Threskiornis aethiopicus (I/D)
Northern bald ibis, Geronticus eremita (A) endangered
Eurasian spoonbill, Platalea leucorodia
African spoonbill, Platalea alba (A) (D)

Osprey
Order: AccipitriformesFamily: Pandionidae

The family Pandionidae contains only one species, the osprey. The osprey is a medium-large raptor which is a specialist fish-eater with a worldwide distribution.

Osprey, Pandion haliaetus

Hawks, eagles, and kites
Order: AccipitriformesFamily: Accipitridae

Accipitridae is a family of birds of prey, which includes hawks, eagles, kites, harriers and Old World vultures. These birds have powerful hooked beaks for tearing flesh from their prey, strong legs, powerful talons and keen eyesight.

Black-winged kite, Elanus caeruleus
Bearded vulture, Gypaetus barbatus near-threatened
Egyptian vulture, Neophron percnopterus endangered
European honey-buzzard, Pernis apivorus (A – Canary Islands)
Swallow-tailed kite, Elanoides forficatus (A) (Canary Islands only)
Cinereous vulture, Aegypius monachus near-threatened
Lappet-faced vulture, Torgos tracheliotos (A)
Hooded vulture, Necrosyrtes monachus (A) (D)
White-backed vulture, Gyps africanus (A) critically endangered
Rüppell's griffon, Gyps rueppelli (A) critically endangered
Eurasian griffon, Gyps fulvus
Bateleur, Terathopius ecaudatus (A) near-threatened
Short-toed snake-eagle, Circaetus gallicus (A – Canary Islands)
Lesser spotted eagle, Clanga pomarina (A)
Greater spotted eagle, Clanga clanga (A) vulnerable
Booted eagle, Hieraaetus pennatus
Steppe eagle, Aquila nipalensis (A) endangered
Spanish eagle, Aquila adalberti vulnerable
Imperial eagle, Aquila heliaca (A) vulnerable
Golden eagle, Aquila chrysaetos
Bonelli's eagle, Aquila fasciata
Eurasian marsh-harrier, Circus aeruginosus
Hen harrier, Circus cyaneus
Pallid harrier, Circus macrourus 
Montagu's harrier, Circus pygargus
Eurasian sparrowhawk, Accipiter nisus
Northern goshawk, Accipiter gentilis 
Red kite, Milvus milvus 
Black kite, Milvus migrans
White-tailed eagle, Haliaeetus albicilla (A)
Rough-legged hawk, Buteo lagopus (A)
Common buzzard, Buteo buteo
Long-legged buzzard, Buteo rufinus (A)

Barn-owls
Order: StrigiformesFamily: Tytonidae

Barn owls are medium to large owls with large heads and characteristic heart-shaped faces. They have long strong legs with powerful talons.

Barn owl, Tyto alba

Owls
Order: StrigiformesFamily: Strigidae

The typical owls are small to large solitary nocturnal birds of prey. They have large forward-facing eyes and ears, a hawk-like beak and a conspicuous circle of feathers around each eye called a facial disk.

Eurasian scops-owl, Otus scops (A – Canary Islands)
Eurasian eagle-owl, Bubo bubo
Pharaoh eagle-owl, Bubo ascalaphus (A)
Snowy owl, Bubo scandiacus (A) (D) (Canary Islands only)
Northern hawk owl, Surnia ulula (B – Canary Islands)
Eurasian pygmy-owl, Glaucidium passerinum (A)
Little owl, Athene noctua
Tawny owl, Strix aluco
Maghreb owl, Strix mauritanica
Long-eared owl, Asio otus
Short-eared owl, Asio flammeus
Marsh owl, Asio capensis (A)
Boreal owl, Aegolius funereus

Hoopoes
Order: BucerotiformesFamily: Upupidae

Hoopoes have black, white and orangey-pink coloring with a large erectile crest on their head.

Eurasian hoopoe, Upupa epops

Kingfishers
Order: CoraciiformesFamily: Alcedinidae

Kingfishers are medium-sized birds with large heads, long, pointed bills, short legs and stubby tails.

Common kingfisher, Alcedo atthis (A – Canary Islands)
Belted kingfisher, Megaceryle alcyon (A)

Bee-eaters
Order: CoraciiformesFamily: Meropidae

The bee-eaters are a group of near passerine birds in the family Meropidae. Most species are found in Africa but others occur in southern Europe, Madagascar, Australia and New Guinea. They are characterised by richly colored plumage, slender bodies and usually elongated central tail feathers. All are colourful and have long downturned bills and pointed wings, which give them a swallow-like appearance when seen from afar.

Blue-cheeked bee-eater, Merops persicus (A)
European bee-eater, Merops apiaster

Rollers
Order: CoraciiformesFamily: Coraciidae

Rollers resemble crows in size and build, but are more closely related to the kingfishers and bee-eaters. They share the colourful appearance of those groups with blues and browns predominating. The two inner front toes are connected, but the outer toe is not.

European roller, Coracias garrulus
Abyssinian roller, Coracias abyssinicus (A) (Canary Islands only)

Woodpeckers
Order: PiciformesFamily: Picidae

Woodpeckers are small to medium-sized birds with chisel-like beaks, short legs, stiff tails and long tongues used for capturing insects. Some species have feet with two toes pointing forward and two backward, while several species have only three toes. Many woodpeckers have the habit of tapping noisily on tree trunks with their beaks.

Eurasian wryneck, Jynx torquilla
Middle spotted woodpecker, Dendrocoptes medius
White-backed woodpecker, Dendrocopos leucotos
Great spotted woodpecker, Dendrocopos major
Lesser spotted woodpecker, Dryobates minor
Levaillant's woodpecker, Picus vaillantii (A) (African enclaves only)
Iberian green woodpecker, Picus sharpei
Black woodpecker, Dryocopus martius

Falcons and caracaras
Order: FalconiformesFamily: Falconidae

Falconidae is a family of diurnal birds of prey. They differ from hawks, eagles and kites in that they kill with their beaks instead of their talons.

Lesser kestrel, Falco naumanni (A – Canary Islands)
Eurasian kestrel, Falco tinnunculus
Red-footed falcon, Falco vespertinus (A – Canary Islands) near-threatened
Amur falcon, Falco amurensis (A)
Eleonora's falcon, Falco eleonorae
Merlin, Falco columbarius
Eurasian hobby, Falco subbuteo (A – Canary Islands)
Lanner falcon, Falco biarmicus (A)
Saker falcon, Falco cherrug (A) endangered
Gyrfalcon, Falco rusticolus (A)
Peregrine falcon, Falco peregrinus (A – Canary Islands)

Old World parrots
Order: PsittaciformesFamily: Psittaculidae

Characteristic features of parrots include a strong curved bill, an upright stance, strong legs, and clawed zygodactyl feet. Many parrots are vividly colored, and some are multi-colored. Old World parrots are found from Africa east across south and southeast Asia and Oceania to Australia and New Zealand.

Rose-ringed parakeet, Psittacula krameri (I)

African and New World parrots
Order: PsittaciformesFamily: Psittacidae

Characteristic features of parrots include a strong curved bill, an upright stance, strong legs, and clawed zygodactyl feet. Many parrots are vividly colored, and some are multi-colored. Most of the more than 150 species in the family are found in the New World. 

Monk parakeet, Myiopsitta monachus (I)
Red-masked parakeet, Psittacara erythrogenys (I)

Tyrant flycatchers
Order: PasseriformesFamily: Tyrannidae

Tyrant flycatchers are Passerine birds which occur throughout North and South America. They superficially resemble the Old World flycatchers, but are more robust and have stronger bills. They do not have the sophisticated vocal capabilities of the songbirds. Most, but not all, are rather plain. As the name implies, most are insectivorous.

Fork-tailed flycatcher, Tyrannus savana (A)

Vireos, shrike-babblers, and erpornis
Order: PasseriformesFamily: Vireonidae

The vireos are a group of small to medium-sized passerine birds restricted to the New World and Southeast Asia.

Red-eyed vireo, Vireo olivaceus (A)

Old World orioles
Order: PasseriformesFamily: Oriolidae

The Old World orioles are colourful passerine birds. They are not related to the New World orioles.

Eurasian golden oriole, Oriolus oriolus

Bushshrikes and allies
Order: PasseriformesFamily: Malaconotidae

Bushshrikes are similar in habits to shrikes, hunting insects and other small prey from a perch on a bush. Although similar in build to the shrikes, these tend to be either colourful species or largely black; some species are quite secretive.

Black-crowned tchagra, Tchagra senegalus

Shrikes
Order: PasseriformesFamily: Laniidae

Shrikes are passerine birds known for their habit of catching other birds and small animals and impaling the uneaten portions of their bodies on thorns. A shrike's beak is hooked, like that of a typical bird of prey.

Red-backed shrike, Lanius collurio
Red-tailed shrike, Lanius phoenicuroides (A)
Isabelline shrike, Lanius isabellinus (A)
Brown shrike, Lanius cristatus (A)
Long-tailed shrike, Lanius schach (A)
Iberian gray shrike,  Lanius meridionalis vulnerable
Great gray shrike, Lanius excubitor (A)
Lesser gray shrike,  Lanius minor
Masked shrike, Lanius nubicus (A)
Woodchat shrike,  Lanius senator

Crows, jays, and magpies
Order: PasseriformesFamily: Corvidae

The family Corvidae includes crows, ravens, jays, choughs, magpies, treepies, nutcrackers and ground jays. Corvids are above average in size among the Passeriformes, and some of the larger species show high levels of intelligence.

Eurasian jay, Garrulus glandarius
Iberian magpie, Cyanopica cooki
Maghreb magpie, Pica mauritanica
Eurasian magpie, Pica pica
Eurasian nutcracker, Nucifraga caryocatactes (A)
Red-billed chough,  Pyrrhocorax pyrrhocorax 
Yellow-billed chough, Pyrrhocorax graculus
Eurasian jackdaw, Corvus monedula
Rook, Corvus frugilegus
Carrion crow, Corvus corone
Hooded crow, Corvus cornix (A)
Pied crow, Corvus albus (A) (D)
Brown-necked raven, Corvus ruficollis (A)
Common raven, Corvus corax

Tits, chickadees, and titmice
Order: PasseriformesFamily: Paridae

The Paridae are mainly small stocky woodland species with short stout bills. Some have crests. They are adaptable birds, with a mixed diet including seeds and insects.

Coal tit, Parus ater
Crested tit, Parus cristatus (A – African enclaves)
Marsh tit, Parus palustris
Eurasian blue tit, Cyanistes caeruleus
African blue tit, Cyanistes teneriffae (A) (D)
Great tit, Parus major

Penduline-tits
Order: PasseriformesFamily: Remizidae

The penduline-tits are a group of small passerine birds related to the true tits. They are insectivores.

Eurasian penduline tit, Remiz pendulinus

Larks
Order: PasseriformesFamily: Alaudidae

Larks are small terrestrial birds with often extravagant songs and display flights. Most larks are fairly dull in appearance. Their food is insects and seeds.

Greater hoopoe-lark, Alaemon alaudipes (A) (Canary Islands and African enclaves only)
Thick-billed lark, Ramphocoris clotbey (A)
Bar-tailed lark, Ammomanes cinctura (A)
Horned lark, Eremophila alpestris (A)
Greater short-toed lark, Calandrella brachydactyla
Bimaculated lark, Melanocorypha bimaculata (A)
Calandra lark, Melanocorypha calandra
Black lark, Melanocorypha yeltoniensis (A)
Dupont's lark, Chersophilus duponti near-threatened
Lesser short-toed lark, Alaudala rufescens
Wood lark, Lullula arborea
White-winged lark, Alauda leucoptera (A)
Eurasian skylark, Alauda arvensis
Thekla's lark, Galerida theklae
Crested lark, Galerida cristata

Bearded reedling
Order: PasseriformesFamily: Panuridae

This species, the only one in its family, is found in reed beds throughout temperate Europe and Asia.

Bearded reedling, Panurus biarmicus

Cisticolas and allies
Order: PasseriformesFamily: Cisticolidae

The Cisticolidae are warblers found mainly in warmer southern regions of the Old World. They are generally very small birds of drab brown or grey appearance found in open country such as grassland or scrub

Zitting cisticola, Cisticola juncidis

Reed warblers and allies
Order: PasseriformesFamily: Acrocephalidae

The members of this family are usually rather large for "warblers". Most are rather plain olivaceous brown above with much yellow to beige below. They are usually found in open woodland, reedbeds, or tall grass. The family occurs mostly in southern to western Eurasia and surroundings, but it also ranges far into the Pacific, with some species in Africa.

Booted warbler, Iduna caligata (A)
Sykes's warbler, Iduna branch (A)
Eastern olivaceous warbler, Iduna pallida (A) (Canary Islands only)
Western olivaceous warbler, Iduna opaca (A – Canary Islands)
Melodious warbler, Hippolais polyglotta
Icterine warbler, Hippolais icterina (A – Canary Islands and African enclaves)
Aquatic warbler, Acrocephalus paludicola (A – Canary Islands) vulnerable
Moustached warbler, Acrocephalus melanopogon
Sedge warbler, Acrocephalus schoenobaenus
Paddyfield warbler, Acrocephalus agricola (A)
Blyth's reed warbler, Acrocephalus dumetorum (A)
Marsh warbler, Acrocephalus palustris (A)
Common reed warbler, Acrocephalus scirpaceus
Great reed warbler, Acrocephalus arundinaceus

Grassbirds and allies 
Order: PasseriformesFamily: Locustellidae

Locustellidae are a family of small insectivorous songbirds found mainly in Eurasia, Africa, and the Australian region. They are smallish birds with tails that are usually long and pointed, and tend to be drab brownish or buffy all over.

River warbler, Locustella fluviatilis (A)
Savi's warbler, Locustella luscinioides
Common grasshopper-warbler, Locustella naevia

Swallows
Order: PasseriformesFamily: Hirundinidae

The family Hirundinidae is adapted to aerial feeding. They have a slender streamlined body, long pointed wings and a short bill with a wide gape. The feet are adapted to perching rather than walking, and the front toes are partially joined at the base.

Tree swallow, Tachycineta bicolor (A)
Plain martin, Riparia paludicola (A)
Bank swallow, Riparia riparia
Eurasian crag-martin, Ptyonoprogne rupestris 
Barn swallow, Hirundo rustica
Red-rumped swallow, Hirundo daurica
Cliff swallow, Petrochelidon pyrrhonota (A – Canary Islands)
Common house-martin, Delichon urbicum

Bulbuls
Order: PasseriformesFamily: Pycnonotidae

Bulbuls are medium-sized songbirds. Some are colourful with yellow, red or orange vents, cheeks, throats or supercilia, but most are drab, with uniform olive-brown to black plumage. Some species have distinct crests.

Red-whiskered bulbul, Pycnonotus jocosus (I)
Common bulbul, Pycnonotus barbatus (A)

Leaf warblers
Order: PasseriformesFamily: Phylloscopidae

Leaf warblers are a family of small insectivorous birds found mostly in Eurasia and ranging into Wallacea and Africa. The species are of various sizes, often green-plumaged above and yellow below, or more subdued with greyish-green to greyish-brown colors.

Wood warbler, Phylloscopus sibilatrix
Western Bonelli's warbler, Phylloscopus bonelli
Eastern Bonelli's warbler, Phylloscopus orientalis (A)
Yellow-browed warbler, Phylloscopus inornatus (A – African enclaves)
Hume's warbler, Phylloscopus humei (A)
Pallas's leaf warbler, Phylloscopus proregulus (A)
Radde's warbler, Phylloscopus schwarzi (A)
Dusky warbler, Phylloscopus fuscatus (A)
Willow warbler, Phylloscopus trochilus
Mountain chiffchaff, Phylloscopus sindianus (A)
Canary Islands chiffchaff, Phylloscopus canariensis (E – Canary Islands)
Common chiffchaff, Phylloscopus collybita
Iberian chiffchaff, Phylloscopus brehmii
Green warbler, Phylloscopus nitidus (A)
Greenish warbler, Phylloscopus trochiloides (A)
Two-barred warbler, Phylloscopus plumbeitarsus (A)
Arctic warbler, Phylloscopus borealis (A)

Bush warblers and allies
Order: PasseriformesFamily: Scotocercidae

The members of this family are found throughout Africa, Asia, and Polynesia. Their taxonomy is in flux, and some authorities place some genera in other families.

Cetti's warbler, Cettia cetti

Long-tailed tits
Order: PasseriformesFamily: Aegithalidae

Long-tailed tits are a group of small passerine birds with medium to long tails. They make woven bag nests in trees. Most eat a mixed diet which includes insects.

Long-tailed tit, Aegithalos longicaudus

Sylviid warblers, parrotbills, and allies
Order: PasseriformesFamily: Sylviidae

The family Sylviidae is a group of small insectivorous passerine birds. They mainly occur as breeding species, as the common name implies, in Europe, Asia and, to a lesser extent, Africa. Most are of generally undistinguished appearance, but many have distinctive songs.

Eurasian blackcap, Sylvia atricapilla
Garden warbler, Sylvia borin
Barred warbler, Curruca nisoria (A)
Lesser whitethroat, Curruca curruca (A)
Western Orphean warbler, Curruca hortensis (A – Canary Islands)
African desert warbler, Curruca nana (A)
Asian desert warbler, Curruca nana (A)
Tristram's warbler, Curruca deserticola (A)
Rüppell's warbler, Curruca ruppeli (A)
Sardinian warbler, Curruca melanocephala
Moltoni's warbler, Curruca subalpina
Western subalpine warbler, Curruca iberiae
Eastern subalpine warbler, Curruca cantillans (A)
Greater whitethroat, Curruca communis
Spectacled warbler, Curruca conspicillata
Marmora's warbler, Curruca sarda (A)
Dartford warbler, Curruca undata near-threatened
Balearic warbler, Curruca balearica (E – Balearic Islands)

Laughingthrushes and allies 
Order: PasseriformesFamily: Leiothrichidae

The laughingthrushes are somewhat diverse in size and colouration, but are characterised by soft fluffy plumage.

Red-billed leiothrix, Leiothrix lutea (I)

Kinglets
Order: PasseriformesFamily: Regulidae

The kinglets, also called crests, are a small group of birds often included in the Old World warblers, but frequently given family status because they also resemble the titmice.

Goldcrest, Regulus regulus
Common firecrest, Regulus ignicapilla

Wallcreeper
Order: PasseriformesFamily: Tichodromidae

The wallcreeper is a small bird related to the nuthatch family, which has stunning crimson, grey and black plumage.

Wallcreeper, Tichodroma muraria

Nuthatches
Order: PasseriformesFamily: Sittidae

Nuthatches are small woodland birds. They have the unusual ability to climb down trees head first, unlike other birds which can only go upwards. Nuthatches have big heads, short tails and powerful bills and feet.

Eurasian nuthatch, Sitta europaea

Treecreepers
Order: PasseriformesFamily: Certhiidae

Treecreepers are small woodland birds, brown above and white below. They have thin pointed down-curved bills, which they use to extricate insects from bark. They have stiff tail feathers, like woodpeckers, which they use to support themselves on vertical trees.

Eurasian treecreeper, Certhia familiaris
Short-toed treecreeper, Certhia brachydactyla

Wrens
Order: PasseriformesFamily: Troglodytidae

The wrens are mainly small and inconspicuous except for their loud songs. These birds have short wings and thin down-turned bills. Several species often hold their tails upright. All are insectivorous.

Eurasian wren, Troglodytes troglodytes

Dippers
Order: PasseriformesFamily: Cinclidae

Dippers are a group of perching birds whose habitat includes aquatic environments in the Americas, Europe and Asia. They are named for their bobbing or dipping movements.

White-throated dipper, Cinclus cinclus

Starlings
Order: PasseriformesFamily: Sturnidae

Starlings are small to medium-sized passerine birds. Their flight is strong and direct and they are very gregarious. Their preferred habitat is fairly open country. They eat insects and fruit. Plumage is typically dark with a metallic sheen.

European starling, Sturnus vulgaris
Spotless starling, Sturnus unicolor
Rosy starling, Pastor roseus (A)

Mockingbirds and thrashers
Order: PasseriformesFamily: Mimidae

The mimids are a family of passerine birds which includes thrashers, mockingbirds, tremblers, and the New World catbirds. These birds are notable for their vocalization, especially their remarkable ability to mimic a wide variety of birds and other sounds heard outdoors. The species tend towards dull grays and browns in their appearance.

Gray catbird, Dumetella carolinensis (A) (Canary Islands only)

Thrushes and allies
Order: PasseriformesFamily: Turdidae

The thrushes are a group of passerine birds that occur mainly in the Old World. They are plump, soft plumaged, small to medium-sized insectivores or sometimes omnivores, often feeding on the ground. Many have attractive songs.

White's thrush, Zoothera aurea (B)
Scaly thrush, Zoothera dauma (A)
Gray-cheeked thrush, Catharus minimus (A – Canary Islands)
Mistle thrush, Turdus viscivorus (A – Canary Islands)
Song thrush, Turdus philomelos
Redwing, Turdus iliacus near-threatened
Eurasian blackbird, Turdus merula
American robin, Turdus migratorius (A)
Eyebrowed thrush, Turdus obscurus (A)
Fieldfare, Turdus pilaris (A – Canary Islands)
Ring ouzel, Turdus torquatus
Black-throated thrush, Turdus atrogularis (A)
Red-throated thrush, Turdus ruficollis (A)
Dusky thrush, Turdus eunomus (A)
Naumann's thrush, Turdus naumanni (A)

Old World flycatchers
Order: PasseriformesFamily: Muscicapidae

Old World flycatchers are a large group of small passerine birds native to the Old World. They are mainly small arboreal insectivores. The appearance of these birds is highly varied, but they mostly have weak songs and harsh calls.

Spotted flycatcher, Muscicapa striata
Rufous-tailed scrub-robin, Cercotrichas galactotes
European robin, Erithacus rubecula
Siberian blue robin, Larvivora cyane (A)
Thrush nightingale, Luscinia luscinia (A)
Common nightingale, Luscinia megarhynchos
Bluethroat, Luscinia svecica (A – Canary Islands)
Red-flanked bluetail, Tarsiger cyanurus (A)	
Red-breasted flycatcher, Ficedula parva (A)
Semicollared flycatcher, Ficedula semitorquata (A)
European pied flycatcher, Ficedula hypoleucaAtlas flycatcher, Ficedula speculigera (A)
Collared flycatcher, Ficedula albicollis (A)
Moussier's redstart, Phoenicurus moussieri (A)
Common redstart, Phoenicurus phoenicurusBlack redstart, Phoenicurus ochrurosRufous-tailed rock-thrush, Monticola saxatilisBlue rock-thrush, Monticola solitarius 
Whinchat, Saxicola rubetraFuerteventura stonechat, Saxicola dacotiae (E – Canary Islands) near-threatened
European stonechat, Saxicola rubicolaSiberian stonechat, Saxicola maurus (A)
Amur stonechat, Saxicola stejnegeri (A)
Northern wheatear, Oenanthe oenantheIsabelline wheatear, Oenanthe isabellina (A)
Desert wheatear, Oenanthe deserti (A – Canary Islands)
Western black-eared wheatear, Oenanthe hispanicaEastern black-eared wheatear, Oenanthe melanoleuca (A)
Red-rumped wheatear, Oenanthe moesta (A)
Black wheatear, Oenanthe leucuraWhite-crowned wheatear, Oenanthe leucopyga (A) (Canary Islands only))
Mourning wheatear, Oenanthe lugens (A)

Waxwings
Order: PasseriformesFamily: Bombycillidae

The waxwings are a group of birds with soft silky plumage and unique red tips to some of the wing feathers. In the Bohemian and cedar waxwings, these tips look like sealing wax and give the group its name. These are arboreal birds of northern forests. They live on insects in summer and berries in winter.

Bohemian waxwing, Bombycilla garrulus (A)

Weavers and allies
Order: PasseriformesFamily: Ploceidae

The weavers are small passerine birds related to the finches. They are seed-eating birds with rounded conical bills. The males of many species are brightly colored, usually in red or yellow and black, some species show variation in color only in the breeding season.

Black-headed weaver, Ploceus melanocephalus (I)
Yellow-crowned bishop, Euplectes afer (I)

Waxbills and allies
Order: PasseriformesFamily: Estrildidae

The estrildid finches are small passerine birds of the Old World tropics and Australasia. They are gregarious and often colonial seed eaters with short thick but pointed bills. They are all similar in structure and habits, but have wide variation in plumage colors and patterns.

Scaly-breasted munia, Lonchura punctulata (I)
Orange-cheeked waxbill, Estrilda melpoda (I)
Common waxbill, Estrilda astrild (I)
Black-rumped waxbill, Estrilda troglodytes (I)
Red avadavat, Amandava amandava (I)

Accentors
Order: PasseriformesFamily: Prunellidae

The accentors are in the only bird family, Prunellidae, which is completely endemic to the Palearctic. They are small, fairly drab species superficially similar to sparrows.

Alpine accentor, Prunella collarisDunnock, Prunella modularis Old World sparrows
Order: PasseriformesFamily: Passeridae

Old World sparrows are small passerine birds. In general, sparrows tend to be small, plump, brown or grey birds with short tails and short powerful beaks. Sparrows are seed eaters, but they also consume small insects.

House sparrow, Passer domesticusItalian sparrow, Passer italiae (A) vulnerable
Spanish sparrow, Passer hispaniolensisDesert sparrow, Passer simplex (A)
Eurasian tree sparrow, Passer montanusRock sparrow, Petronia petroniaWhite-winged snowfinch, Montifringilla nivalisWagtails and pipits
Order: PasseriformesFamily: Motacillidae

Motacillidae is a family of small passerine birds with medium to long tails. They include the wagtails, longclaws and pipits. They are slender, ground feeding insectivores of open country.

Gray wagtail,  Motacilla cinereaWestern yellow wagtail, Motacilla flavaEastern yellow wagtail, Motacilla tschutschensis (A)
Citrine wagtail,  Motacilla citreola (A – Canary Islands)
White wagtail,  Motacilla alba (A)
Richard's pipit, Anthus richardi (A – Canary Islands)
Blyth's pipit, Anthus godlewskii (A)
Tawny pipit, Anthus campestrisBerthelot's pipit, Anthus berthelotii (Canary Islands only)
Meadow pipit, Anthus pratensis near-threatened
Tree pipit, Anthus trivialisOlive-backed pipit, Anthus hodgsoni  (A)
Pechora pipit, Anthus gustavi  (A)
Red-throated pipit, Anthus cervinusWater pipit, Anthus spinoletta (A – Canary Islands)
Rock pipit, Anthus petrosusAmerican pipit, Anthus rubescens (A)

Finches, euphonias, and allies
Order: PasseriformesFamily: Fringillidae

Finches are seed-eating passerine birds, that are small to moderately large and have a strong beak, usually conical and in some species very large. All have twelve tail feathers and nine primaries. These birds have a bouncing flight with alternating bouts of flapping and gliding on closed wings, and most sing well.

Common chaffinch, Fringilla coelebsTenerife blue chaffinch, Fringilla teydea (E – Canary Islands)
Gran Canaria blue chaffinch, Fringilla polatzeki (E – Canary Islands)
Brambling, Fringilla montifringilla (A – Canary Islands)
Hawfinch, Coccothraustes coccothraustes (A – Canary Islands)
Common rosefinch, Carpodacus erythrinus (A)
Eurasian bullfinch, Pyrrhula pyrrhula (A – African enclaves)
Trumpeter finch, Rhodopechys githaginea (A – African enclaves)
Desert finch, Rhodospiza obsoleta (A) (D)
European greenfinch, Chloris chlorisTwite, Linaria flavirostris (A)
Eurasian linnet, Linaria cannabinaCommon redpoll, Acanthis flammea (A)
Lesser redpoll, Acanthis cabaret (A)
Red crossbill, Loxia curvirostra (A – Canary Islands)
European goldfinch, Carduelis carduelisCitril finch, Carduelis citrinella (A – African enclaves)
European serin, Serinus serinusIsland canary, Serinus canaria (Canary Islands only)
Eurasian siskin, Spinus spinusLongspurs and snow buntings
Order: PasseriformesFamily: Calcariidae

The Calcariidae are a group of passerine birds which had been traditionally grouped with the New World sparrows, but differ in a number of respects and are usually found in open grassy areas.

Lapland longspur, Calcarius lapponicus (A)
Snow bunting, Plectrophenax nivalis 

Old World buntings
Order: PasseriformesFamily: Emberizidae

The emberizids are a large family of passerine birds. They are seed-eating birds with distinctively shaped bills.  Many emberizid species have distinctive head patterns.

Black-headed bunting, Emberiza melanocephala (A)
Red-headed bunting, Emberiza bruniceps (A)
Corn bunting, Miliaria calandraRock bunting, Emberiza ciaMeadow bunting, Emberiza cioides (A) (D)
Cirl bunting, Emberiza cirlusYellowhammer, Emberiza citrinella (A – African enclaves)
Pine bunting, Emberiza leucocephalos (A)
Ortolan bunting, Emberiza hortulanaCretzschmar's bunting, Emberiza caesia (A)
House bunting, Emberiza sahari (A)
Reed bunting, Emberiza schoeniclus (A – Canary Islands)
Yellow-breasted bunting, Emberiza aureola (A) critically endangered
Little bunting, Emberiza pusilla (A)
Rustic bunting, Emberiza rustica (A) vulnerable
Black-faced bunting, Emberiza spodocephala (A) 
Yellow-browed bunting, Emberiza chrysophrys (A) 

New World sparrows
Order: PasseriformesFamily: Passerellidae

The New World sparrows (or American sparrows) are a large family of seed-eating passerine birds with distinctively finch-like bills.

Dark-eyed junco, Junco hyemalis (A)
White-throated sparrow, Zonotrichia albicollis (A)
Song sparrow, Melospiza melodia (A)

Troupials and allies
Order: PasseriformesFamily: Icteridae

Icterids make up a family of small- to medium-sized, often colorful, New-World passerine birds. Most species have black as a predominant plumage color, often enlivened by yellow, orange or red. The species in the family vary widely in size, shape, behavior and coloration.

Bobolink, Dolichonyx oryzivorus (A) (Canary Islands only)
Baltimore oriole, Icterus galbula (A)

New World warblers
Order: PasseriformesFamily: Parulidae

The New World warblers are a group of small often colorful passerine birds restricted to the New World. Most are arboreal, but some are more terrestrial. Most members of this family are insectivores.

Louisiana waterthrush, Parkesia motacilla (A)
Northern waterthrush, Parkesia noveboracensis (A) (Canary Islands only)
Black-and-white warbler, Mniotilta varia (A) (Canary Islands only)
Common yellowthroat, Geothlypis trichas (A)
American redstart, Setophaga ruticilla (A)
Blackpoll warbler, Setophaga striata (A)
Yellow-rumped warbler, Setophaga coronata (A)

Cardinals and allies
Order: PasseriformesFamily: Cardinalidae

The cardinals are a family of robust, seed-eating birds with strong bills. They are typically associated with open woodland. The sexes usually have distinct plumages.

Rose-breasted grosbeak || Pheucticus ludovicianus'' || (A)

See also 
 List of birds
 Lists of birds by region

References

Birds
Spain
Spain
Spain